Belotserkovka is a rural locality (a selo) in Konstantinovsky Selsoviet, Kulundinsky District, Altai Krai, Russia. The population was 81 as of 2013. There are 2 streets.

Geography 
Belotserkovka is located 39 km northeast of Kulunda (the district's administrative centre) by road. Krasnaya Sloboda is the nearest rural locality.

References 

Rural localities in Kulundinsky District